The Eparchy of Marthandom (also called Marthandam) is a Syro-Malankara Catholic Church ecclesiastical territory or eparchy in Kanyakumari District, Tamil Nadu, India. It was created by Pope John Paul II on 16 December 1996. It was the fourth eparchy of the Syro-Malankara Catholic Church. Its territory covers three civil districts: Kaliakkavilai, Marthandam, Nagercoil. The Syro-Malankara Catholic Church in Kanyakumari District is among the largest religious groups in the region. The Eparchy of Marthandam is a suffragan eparchy in the ecclesiastical province of the Archeparchy of Trivandrum.

References
History of the Marthandam Diocese

Syro-Malankara Catholic dioceses
Eastern Catholic dioceses in India
Christianity in Tamil Nadu
Dioceses established in the 20th century
Christian organizations established in 1996
1996 establishments in Tamil Nadu